French ship Trajan may refer to:

French ship Trajan (1792)
French ship Trajan (1811)

French Navy ship names